The Public Bodies (Admission to Meetings) Act 1960 is an Act of the Parliament of the United Kingdom which allowed members of the public and press to attend meetings of certain public bodies.  The Act is notable for having been initiated as a private member's bill drawn up by Margaret Thatcher, and also for being introduced in a maiden speech, a unique feat for successful legislation. On 5 February 1960,  Thatcher's speech was delivered without notes, and was lauded as the best maiden speech amongst the 1959 new intake.

The Act was introduced primarily to prevent circumvention of rules prohibiting councils from excluding the press by calling a Committee of the Whole, a tactic that had been used by Labour-controlled councils during an industrial dispute in the printing industry in 1958.  A similar bill had been introduced a number of years earlier by Lionel Heald, who helped guide Thatcher through the legislative process.

References

External links
 

United Kingdom Acts of Parliament 1960